was a Japanese editor, acclaimed screenplay writer, and historical fiction writer.

List of novels

 The Blade of the Courtesans (2008, Vertical Inc)

References

Japanese historical novelists
Writers of historical mysteries
1923 births
1989 deaths
20th-century novelists